Paola Senatore (born 9 November 1949) is an Italian retired film actress.

Biography
Born in Rome, Paola Senatore worked in Italian genre films during the 1970s, including poliziotteschi, commedia sexy all'italiana and giallo films. These included cult films such as Ricco the Mean Machine (1973), Story of a Cloistered Nun (1973), The Flower with the Petals of Steel (1973), The Killer Reserved Nine Seats (1974), Salon Kitty (1976), Emanuelle in America (1977), Images in a Convent (1979) and Umberto Lenzi's cannibal film Eaten Alive! (1980). In the mid-1980s, after two soft-core erotic films directed by Joe D'Amato and because of drug problems and pregnancy, she accepted starring in pornographic magazines and in a hard-core film, Non stop... sempre buio in sala. 

Her film career ended in September 1985 when she was arrested for possession and trafficking of drugs.

Partial filmography

Robin Hood: the Invincible Archer (1970)
A.A.A. Massaggiatrice bella presenza offresi... (1972) - Cristina Graziani
Donnez-nous notre amour quotidien (1973) - Beatrice
Women in Cell Block 7 (1973) - 'Mammasantissima' lover
Ricco the Mean Machine (1973) - Concetta Aversi
Servo suo (1973)
Story of a Cloistered Nun (1973) - Michela
The Flower with the Petals of Steel (1973) - Daniela
Provaci anche tu Lionel (1973)
The Killer Reserved Nine Seats (1974) - Lynn Davenant
Madeleine, anatomia di un incubo (1974) - Mary
L'erotomane (1974) - Onorevole Belloni
Un amour comme le nôtre (1974) - Béatrice
Zig Zig (1975) - Madame Bruyère
Salon Kitty (1976) - Marika
Càlamo (1976) - Serena
Like Rabid Dogs (1976) - Germana
Emanuelle in America (1977) - Laura Elvize
Il ginecologo della mutua (1977) - Pamela
Oil! (1977) - Diana Astor
Impossible Love (1977) - Rosa
Nenè (1977) - Ju and Pa's Mother
La mujer de la tierra caliente (1978) - Ángela
Bersaglio altezza uomo (1978) - La pupa dei gangsters
Night Nurse (1979) - Zaira
Where Can You Go Without the Little Vice? (1979) - Simona
Images in a Convent (1979) - Isabella
Don't Trust the Mafia (1979) - Paulette Maurice
Action (1980) - Ann Shimpton
Eaten Alive! (1980) - Diana
La settimana al mare (1981) - Margareth
La dottoressa preferisce i marinai (1981) - Paola
Ti spacco il muso, bimba! (1982) - Lidia
Malombra (1984) - Carlotta / Marco's aunt
Maladonna (1984) - Maria / Osvaldo's Wife
Non stop sempre buio in sala (1985)
La sfida erotica (1986)
Penombra (1987) - Maria / Carlotta (final film role)

References

External links
 

1949 births
Living people
Italian film actresses
Actresses from Rome
Italian stage actresses
Italian pornographic film actresses
20th-century Italian actresses